Futebol Clube do Porto, commonly referred to as FC Porto (or FC Porto Fidelidade, for sponsorship purposes), or simply Porto, is a Portuguese professional roller hockey team based in Porto. It is the senior representative side of the roller hockey section of multi-sports club FC Porto, a Portuguese sports club based in Porto. 

The team competes domestically in the top-tier Portuguese First Division league, and internationally in the Euroleague. It plays its home matches at the Dragão Arena, alongside the club's basketball and handball teams, and is managed by Spanish head coach Ricardo Ares.

Team

Current squad
The following players compose the squad for the 2021–22 season:

Goalkeepers (GK)
1  Xavier Malián
82  Tiago Rodrigues

Defenders / Midfielders (DF/MF)
5  Telmo Pinto
11  Carlos Ramos
26  Xavier Barroso
57  Reinaldo García (Captain)

Forwards (FW)
7  Ezequiel Mena
9  Rafael Costa
19  Carlo Di Benedetto
70  Hugo Santos
77  Gonçalo Alves

Technical staff

Honours
In terms of total number of trophies, Porto is the most decorated team in Portuguese competitions, holding the record for most cup and super cup wins. They won their first championship in 1982–83, the first season under the presidency of Jorge Nuno Pinto da Costa. Notably, Porto won the Primeira Divisão title for a record 10 consecutive seasons between 2001 and 2011. Internationally, Porto have also won multiple competitions, including two CERH European League titles in 1986 and 1990 and one Intercontinental Cup in 2021.

Domestic competitions
Portuguese First Division
Winners (24) – record: 1982–83, 1983–84, 1984–85, 1985–86, 1986–87, 1988–89, 1989–90, 1990–91, 1998–99, 1999–00, 2001–02, 2002–03, 2003–04, 2004–05, 2005–06, 2006–07, 2007–08, 2008–09, 2009–10, 2010–11, 2012–13, 2016–17, 2018–19, 2021–22

Portuguese Cup
Winners (18) – record: 1982–83, 1984–85, 1985–86, 1986–87, 1987–88, 1988–89, 1995–96, 1997–98, 1998–99, 2004–05, 2005–06, 2007–08, 2008–09, 2012–13, 2015–16, 2016–17, 2017–18, 2021–22

Portuguese Super Cup
Winners (23) – record: 1984, 1985, 1986, 1987, 1988, 1989, 1990, 1991, 1992, 1996, 1998, 2000, 2005, 2006, 2007, 2008, 2009, 2011, 2013, 2016, 2017, 2018, 2019

European competitions
Euroleague
Winners (2): 1985–86, 1989–90

World Skate Europe Cup
Winners (2): 1993–94, 1995–96

Cup Winners' Cup
Winners (2): 1981–82, 1982–83

Continental Cup
Winners (1): 1986

World competitions
 Intercontinental Cup
 Winners (1): 2021

References

External links
 

FC Porto
Rink hockey clubs in Portugal